Antonio Gaspari was an Italian architect of the late-Baroque, active in both Venice and the terrafirma of the Veneto. He was a pupil of Baldassarre Longhena, and upon his master's death in 1682, he completed some of his projects, including Longhena's most famous work, the imposing church of Santa Maria della Salute.  He likely died in his homestead in Castelguglielmo, in Polesine. One of his sons, Giovanni Paolo Gaspari (1712-1775), was a painter active mainly in Germany.

Works
Santa Maria della Fava, Venice
Ca' Zenobio degli Armeni, Venice
Santa Sofia, Venice (reconstruction)
San Marcuola, Venice (posthumous, left incomplete)
Palazzo Barbaro a San Vidal, Venice (enlargement)
Palazzo Michiel dalle Colonne, Venice (restoration)
Villa Giovanelli Colonna, Noventa Padovana
Duomo Abbaziale di Santa Tecla in Este
Palazzo Capitanale, Lavis (enlargement)

Bibliography
Elena Bassi, Episodi dell'architettura veneta nell'opera di Antonio Gaspari, Saggi e Memorie di Storia dell'Arte, 3, 1963
Bruno Cogo, Antonio Gaspari architetto Veniceno: dati biografici (1656-1723), il suo capolavoro, Este, Grafica Atestina, 2003

Italian Baroque architects